In enzymology, a 4-formylbenzenesulfonate dehydrogenase is an enzyme that catalyzes the chemical reaction

4-formylbenzenesulfonate + NAD+ + H2O  4-sulfobenzoate + NADH + 2 H+

The 3 substrates of this enzyme are 4-formylbenzenesulfonate, NAD+, and H2O, whereas its 3 products are 4-sulfobenzoate, NADH, and H+.

This enzyme belongs to the family of oxidoreductases, specifically those acting on the aldehyde or oxo group of donor with NAD+ or NADP+ as acceptor.  The systematic name of this enzyme class is 4-formylbenzenesulfonate:NAD+ oxidoreductase. This enzyme participates in 2,4-dichlorobenzoate degradation.

References

 
 

EC 1.2.1
NADH-dependent enzymes
Enzymes of unknown structure